LeFrancis F. Arnold (November 24, 1952 – September 2, 2013) was an American football offensive guard who played one season for the Denver Broncos of the National Football League (NFL) in 1974. He was also drafted in the 32nd round (384) by the Houston Texans in the 1974 WFL Draft.

References

1952 births
Players of American football from Los Angeles
Denver Broncos players
American football offensive guards
Oregon Ducks football players
2013 deaths